The 1912 Calgary municipal election was held on December 9, 1912 to elect a Mayor and twelve Aldermen to sit on the twenty-eighth Calgary City Council from January 2, 1913 to January 2, 1914. Nominations closed on December 4, 1912.

Background
The election was held under multiple non-transferable vote where each elector was able to cast a ballot for the mayor and up to three ballots for separate councillors with a voter's designated ward.

Incumbent Mayor John William Mitchell was predicted to contest the Ward 3 Alderman's office, but did not file nomination papers. The Weekly Albertan called Mitchell the most popular Mayor in Calgary's history.

The Morning Albertan claimed the city prepared an insufficient number of polling booths and election officials, which resulted in many voters being unable to cast their ballot.

Results
Election results from the Calgary Daily Herald and Morning Albertan.

Mayor

Commissioner

Councillors

Ward 1

Ward 2

Ward 3

Ward 4

School board trustee

See also
List of Calgary municipal elections

References

Municipal elections in Calgary
1912 elections in Canada
1910s in Calgary